The Ferves was an Italian automobile manufacturer from 1965 until 1970.  Based on the Fiat 500, it was a multi-purpose car powered by a rear-mounted 499 cc two-cylinder in-line engine.  It was available as a two-wheel drive or four wheel drive and had a maximum speed of around 45 mph.  There was also a cargo version with a carrying capacity of 300 kg.  The engine and steering were from the Fiat 500 and the suspension and brakes from the Fiat 600.  The chassis numbers commenced at 300 for the passenger version and 100 for the cargo.

History

First seen at the 1966 Turin Motor Show, Ferves (FERrari VEicoli Speciali) introduced the Ranger as a small "off-road" derivative of the Fiat 500 and Fiat 600.  The car had an open body with 4 vinyl-covered seats, a folding windscreen, and removable suicide doors on early models, later models had normally hinged doors.  All 600 cars built were Left Hand Drive

References
David Burgess Wise, The New Illustrated Encyclopaedia of Automobiles.

External links 
 A Ferves Ranger on YouTube

Defunct motor vehicle manufacturers of Italy